La stravaganza [literally 'Extravagance'] (The Eccentricity), Op. 4, is a set of concertos written by Antonio Vivaldi in 1712–1713.  The set was first published in 1716 in Amsterdam and was dedicated to Venetian nobleman Vettor Delfino, who had been a violin student of Vivaldi's. All of the concertos are scored for solo violin, strings, and basso continuo; however, some movements require extra soloists (such as a second violin and/or cello solo).

List of concerti
These works are laid out in the following movements:

La Stravaganza, Op.4, Concerto No. 1 in B-flat major, RV 383a:
Allegro
Largo e cantabile
Allegro

La Stravaganza, Op.4, Concerto No. 2 in E minor, RV 279:
Allegro
Largo
Allegro

La Stravaganza, Op.4, Concerto No. 3 in G major, RV 301:
Allegro
Largo
Allegro assai

La Stravaganza, Op.4, Concerto No. 4 in A minor, RV 357:
Allegro
Grave e sempre piano
Allegro

La Stravaganza, Op.4, Concerto No. 5 in A major, RV 347:
Allegro
Largo
Allegro (moderato)

La Stravaganza, Op.4, Concerto No. 6 in G minor, RV 316a:
Allegro
Largo
Allegro

La Stravaganza, Op.4, Concerto No. 7 in C major, RV 185:
Largo
Allegro (molto)
Largo
Allegro

La Stravaganza, Op.4, Concerto No. 8 in D minor, RV 249:
Allegro – Adagio – Presto – Adagio
Allegro

La Stravaganza, Op.4, Concerto No. 9 in F major, RV 284:
Allegro
Largo
Allegro

La Stravaganza, Op.4, Concerto No. 10 in C minor, RV 196:
Spiritoso
Adagio
Allegro

La Stravaganza, Op.4, Concerto No. 11 in D major, RV 204:
Allegro
Largo
Allegro assai

La Stravaganza, Op.4, Concerto No. 12 in G major, RV 298:
Spiritoso e non presto
Largo
Allegro

Notable Recordings
 Vivaldi: La Stravaganza (12 Violin Concertos, Op. 4), Zino Vinnikov (Violin & Music Director), Soloists' Ensemble of the St. Petersburg Philharmonic Orchestra, September 2014.
 Vivaldi, La Stravaganza, Rachel Podger (Violin), Channel Classics, 2003, CCS SA 19503. This recording won the Gramophone Award for Best Baroque Recording of 2003.

References

External links
 

Vivaldi
Compositions by Antonio Vivaldi
Concertos by Antonio Vivaldi
1714 compositions